Jiwan Pariyar is a Nepali politician belonging to Nepali Congress. He is the elected deputy general secretary of the ruling party elected by 14th general convention of Nepali Congress.

Political life 
Pariyar was elected to the post under dalit quota. He's also the member of 2nd Nepalese Constituent Assembly elected under proportional list.

Electoral history

2017 Nepalese provincial elections 
Kaski 1(A)

References 

Year of birth missing (living people)
Living people
Khas people
People from Kaski District
Nepal MPs 2022–present
Members of the 2nd Nepalese Constituent Assembly